Juventud Barranco is a Peruvian football club, playing in the city of Huacho, Lima, Peru.

History
In the 2010 Copa Perú, the club classified to the National Stage, but was eliminated by Atlético Pucallpa in the Round of 16.

Honours

Regional
Región IV: 0
Runner-up (1): 2010

Liga Departamental de Lima: 1
Winners (1): 2010

Liga Distrital de Huacho: 3
Winners (3): 2006, 2009, 2010

See also
List of football clubs in Peru
Peruvian football league system

External links
 Official Web

Football clubs in Peru
Association football clubs established in 1963